is a Japanese light novel series written by Yashu. The series originated on the Shōsetsuka ni Narō website in October 2016, before being published in print with illustrations by Mo by Hifumi Shobō beginning in June 2017 under their Saga Forest imprint. As of December 2019, six volumes have been released. A manga adaptation, illustrated by Nini, began serialization on Mag Garden's Mag Comi manga website in March 2018. As of December 2022, the manga's individual chapters have been collected into nine volumes. An anime television series adaptation by EMT Squared and Magic Bus will premiere in April 2023.

Plot
A Japanese teenager is killed by a thug and reincarnates in an alternate, fantasy-like world as Cain Von Silford, the third son of the noble Von Silford family thanks to the intervention of the seven gods residing there. Accepting the task from the gods of helping improve their world with the knowledge from his past life, Cain is appointed as their Apostle and receives powerful blessings from them, unaware that his true mission is to protect the world from a forgotten, evil deity who is about to awake.

Characters

A japanese teenager who was killed by a thug and reincarnated in another world as the son of a lord in the Esfort Kingdom. Blessed with the power of all 7 gods, Cain quickly grows far stronger than any other human, using the power at his disposal to protect the innocents and punish evildoers, which soon brings the attention of the king, who arranges him to be engaged with his daughter, Telestia and her close friend Silk; this goes against Cain's wishes, as he loathes noble etiquette. Through the course of the series, Cain grows stronger while earning titles and achievements, with other girls also becoming engaged with him, as he prepares himself to fight an evil god who is about to awake after being sealed away centuries ago.

The second princess of the Kingdom. Fell in love with Cain after he saved her and Silk.

Daughter of Duke Santana. Fell in love with Cain after he saved her and Telestia.

Tifana is an elf knight and daughter of a duke from the northern regions of the kingdom. She meets Cain and becomes interested on him, later becoming his third fianceé.

Cain's older sister who dotes on him.

Media

Light novel
Written by Yashu, the series began publication on the novel posting website Shōsetsuka ni Narō on October 28, 2016. The series was later acquired by Hifumi Shobō, who began publishing the series with illustrations by Mo on June 15, 2017 under their Saga Forest imprint. As of December 2019, six volumes have been released.

Volume list

Manga
A manga adaptation, illustrated by Nini, began serialization on Mag Garden's Mag Comi website on March 25, 2018. As of December 2022, the manga's individual chapters have been collected into nine tankōbon volumes.

In December 2020, Seven Seas Entertainment announced that they licensed the manga adaptation for English publication.

Volume list

Anime
An anime television series adaptation, titled The Aristocrat's Otherworldly Adventure: Serving Gods Who Go Too Far, was announced on August 5, 2022. It will be produced by EMT Squared and Magic Bus and directed by Noriyuki Nakamura, with Ayumu Hatori serving as a producer, Natsuko Takahashi in charge of series composition, Eri Tokugawa designing the characters and Michiru composing the music. The series is set to premiere on April 3, 2023, on Tokyo MX and BS11. The opening theme song is "Preview" performed by Aya Uchida, while the ending theme song is  performed by 7Land. Crunchyroll licensed the series outside of Asia.

Reception
MrAJCosplay from Anime News Network praised the magic system of the series, though felt that nothing was very memorable.

The series has sold over 2.8 million copies.

References

External links
  
  
  
  
 

2017 Japanese novels
2023 anime television series debuts
Anime and manga based on light novels
Crunchyroll anime
EMT Squared
Fiction about reincarnation
Isekai anime and manga
Isekai novels and light novels
Japanese webcomics
Light novels
Light novels first published online
Mag Garden manga
Magic Bus (studio)
Seven Seas Entertainment titles
Shōnen manga
Shōsetsuka ni Narō
Tokyo MX original programming
Upcoming anime television series
Webcomics in print